Lucienne Granier (29 November 1923 in Béziers – 30 October 2005 idem) was a French movie actress.

Filmography 
 1949: Jean de la Lune by Marcel Achard as Étiennette
 1949: Keep an Eye on Amelia by Claude Autant-Lara as Palmyre
 1951: Un amour de parapluie, short film by Jean Laviron
 1951: The Straw Lover by Gilles Grangier as la dame en noir
 1953: The Secret of Helene Marimon by Henri Calef as Mme Delabarre
 1953: Royal Affairs in Versailles by Sacha Guitry as Mme de Senlis
 1955: Caroline and the Rebels by Jean Devaivre
 1956: If Paris Were Told to Us by Sacha Guitry as la provinciale

External links 
 
 Lucienne Granier on lesgensducinema

French actresses
1923 births
People from Béziers
2005 deaths
20th-century French women